Pennsylvania's 11th congressional district is located in the southeast-central part of the state. It includes all of Lancaster County and portions of York County south and east of but not including the city of York. Republican Lloyd Smucker represents the district.

Prior to 2018, the 11th district was located in the east-central part of the state. The Supreme Court of Pennsylvania redrew the district in February 2018 after ruling the previous map unconstitutional, centering it around Pottsville and renumbering it as the ninth district. The new 11th district is essentially the successor to the old 16th District, with representation per the elections of 2018 onward. With the 2020 redictricting cycle, the Pennsylvania district's border between Hanover and York was adjusted to include less land north of Spring Grove and more to the southeast of York, effective with the 2022 elections.

Republican Lou Barletta represented the 11th district within its former boundaries from 2011 to 2019, the first Republican to do so in almost 30 years.

Recent election results in statewide elections

District boundaries 2003–2019
From 2003 to 2013 the district included Scranton, Wilkes-Barre, Hazleton and most of the Poconos. With a strong base in areas of industry and ethnic groups, it was once considered a very safe Democratic seat but has become more competitive in recent years. Former longtime Democratic incumbent Paul Kanjorski faced his closest contest ever in 2008, narrowly defeating Lou Barletta, the Republican mayor of Hazleton, 138,849 to 129,358. In 2010, Kanjorski was unseated by Barletta in a 45%–55% vote.

The district was substantially redrawn by the state legislature in the course of the 2012 redistricting after the 2010 census, significantly altering the 11th. It lost Scranton and Wilkes-Barre to the 17th district. To make up for the loss in population, the 11th was pushed into more rural and Republican-leaning territory to the north and south. It then stretched from the Poconos all the way to the suburbs of Harrisburg.

The district includes the most Amish communities of any congressional district in the United States. The current representative, Lloyd Smucker, belonged to the Old Order Amish at the time of his birth, but his family left the community when he was five years old.

List of members representing the district

1795–1823: One seat
District created in 1795.

1823–1833: Two seats

1833–present: One seat

Recent election results

2012

2014

2016

2018

2020

2022

Historical district boundaries

See also

List of United States congressional districts
Pennsylvania's congressional districts

References

 
 
 Congressional Biographical Directory of the United States 1774–present

External links
 Congressional redistricting in Pennsylvania
 Presidential Election Results by Congressional District

11
Constituencies established in 1795
1795 establishments in Pennsylvania